Pelkosenniemi is a municipality of Finland.

Pelkosenniemi is located in the province of Lapland. The municipality has a population of 
(), which make it the smallest municipality in Lapland in terms of population.
which 
is water. The population density is
. Neighbour municipalities are Kemijärvi, Rovaniemi, Salla, Savukoski and Sodankylä.

The municipality is unilingually Finnish and in 2000 was the last remaining municipality in Finland to have its entire population consist of native speakers of Finnish. As of 2010 there were two native speakers of other languages in Pelkosenniemi.

Pelkosenniemi hosts a popular mosquito swatting competition.

History 
The area was originally inhabited by Sámi people who spoke the Kemi Sámi language.

The first Finnish settler in the area was Paavali Pelkonen from Lumijoki, who came to the area, then called Kilpimaa, in the 1670s. The area was still property of the Sompio siida. Later it was a part of the Sodankylä parish, under which it acquired its first chapel in 1857. The community was called Alaperä at that time. Pelkosenniemi became a separate parish in 1916, as did Savukoski.

Notable people
Andy McCoy, formerly Antti Hulkko, lead guitarist of Hanoi Rocks, was born in Pelkosenniemi.

References

External links

Municipality of Pelkosenniemi – Official website

 
Populated places established in 1916